Ernest A. Becker (1914 – January 5, 1998) was an American tennis player, coach, and college athletics administrator.  He was a founding dean, first athletic director, and important influence at the beginning of Orange County State College, which became California State University, Fullerton.  According to the Orange County Register, Becker

Becker started out at Orange County State College as the founding Dean of Students in 1959 when he first came to the school. He was an Emeritus Philosophy Professor. Becker was a major factor in choosing the school's athletic team nickname, the Titans.

Educational degrees
1936 Graduate of Amherst College, BA received in history and philosophy
USC graduate degree received in divinity
USC doctoral degree received in higher education

Military service
World War II naval chaplain

Collegiate tennis player
During the mid-1930s Becker was a member of the Amherst College men's tennis team and is a "Mammoths Letterman" from competing on the team.

Titans men's tennis coach

He was instrumental in starting and coaching the early years of Orange County State College (known now as Cal State Fullerton Titans Tennis) varsity men's tennis team at the school in the early 1960s. Becker was well respected by his players on the team from team captain Mitchel Saadi '64, Dennis Silver '63, Ken Smith Jr., Ernie Lopez '64, Jim Blondin '63, Tony Keeling, Ben Wade '63 and George Rentfro '62 who all also looked at him as a father figure and mentor. In Becker's younger days he was quite a practice player and tennis enthusiast hitting tennis balls with the legendary tennis professional Bill Tilden according to his players on the team at Fullerton he loved talking about tennis.

Pachyderm race
According to Jack Hale, later an insurance agent in Anaheim, he and Becker brainstormed the idea of hosting an intercollegiate elephant race as a way of relating elephants to the college team nickname "Titans" - a  nickname which Becker had promoted and which had been chosen by a student vote in 1959. As a result of the 1962 races, an elephant was chosen as the mascot or symbol of the Titans.

Hale had lived in Africa and Becker had done postgraduate work in India.  Early plans to race the Coast Guard failed, but eventually on May 11, 1962, a total of 15 elephants raced, with "Sunita" of the Harvard Crimson winning.  The event was televised live and was one of the Associated Press' Top 10 stories of 1962, and it put the Orange County school into national level awareness.

Various accounts of the idea for the elephant race exist, but most involve Becker near the center.

Harvard's The Crimson coverage in 1962 includes mention that "Orange State, a new school in the California state college system, is scheduled to grow to more than 25,000 students within 15 years," and that "the school has large tracts of unimproved land which, according to Becker, 'make ideal elephant pastures.'"

Pachyderm association with Fullerton may also have related to the growing and packaging of Elephant oranges, a local, huge variety of the Valencia orange, see Elephant Packing House, a listed historic site in Fullerton.

Tragedy
Becker was repeatedly in the news also relating to trials and followups to a family tragedy;  Becker's son Stephen was among seven killed in a shooting spree on the Fullerton campus.  Becker occasionally commented about the convicted killer, when contacted by media at times of appeal hearings.

References

1914 births
1998 deaths
American tennis coaches
Amherst Mammoths men's tennis players
Cal State Fullerton Titans athletic directors
Cal State Fullerton Titans men's tennis coaches
University of Southern California alumni